The Zerbe Sextuplane was an unconventional early aircraft designed by James Slough Zerbe around 1908. The aircraft mounted six wings, heavily staggered, above a framework on which the pilot sat; propulsion was provided by a single propeller mounted in a tractor configuration. No record survives of the Sextuplane's performance.

References

Sextuplane
Multiplane aircraft
Single-engined tractor aircraft
1900s United States experimental aircraft
Aircraft first flown in 1908